William J. Eaton (December 9, 1930 – August 23, 2005) was an American journalist.

He won a Pulitzer Prize in 1970 for his Chicago Daily News coverage of the confirmation battle over Clement Haynsworth, an unsuccessful Richard Nixon nominee for the Supreme Court of the United States. This landed him on the master list of Nixon political opponents.

In 1980 he shared the Gerald Loeb Award for Large Newspapers for his reporting on the U.S. energy crisis.

From 1984 to 1988, Eaton was chief of the Moscow bureau of the Los Angeles Times. 
He retired in 1994, then became curator of the Hubert H. Humphrey Fellows journalism program at the University of Maryland. He was a past president of the National Press Club.

References

Staff report (August 25, 2005). William J. Eaton; Journalist, 74. New York Times

External links

1930 births
2005 deaths
American male journalists
20th-century American journalists
Pulitzer Prize for National Reporting winners
Chicago Daily News people
Gerald Loeb Award winners for Large Newspapers